Raymond William Mabbutt (13 March 1936 – 31 October 2016) was an English footballer, the father of former players Gary Mabbutt and Kevin Mabbutt. Mabbutt played for Oxford City, Bristol Rovers, Newport County and Trowbridge Town. He later played for Clevedon Town for one season between 1974 and 1975, becoming the club's first fully professional paid player.

References

1936 births
2016 deaths
English footballers
Oxford City F.C. players
Bristol Rovers F.C. players
Newport County A.F.C. players
Trowbridge Town F.C. players
Clevedon Town F.C. players
Association football midfielders